The Flight over Vienna was an air raid during World War I undertaken by Italian poet and nationalist Gabriele D'Annunzio on .

The action was planned the year before but technical problems, such as the fuel capacity of the planes, delayed it.

They flew over Vienna and dropped 50,000 leaflets on a three-colored card (green, white, and red: the colors of the Italian flag). The text was written by D'Annunzio himself and was not translated into German. It read:

Previously, critics of D'Annunzio had said: "He writes but does not act." Because D'Annunzio's Italian text was considered ineffectual and not translatable into German, Ferdinando Martini quipped: "Now he acts but does not write."

They also dropped 350,000 leaflets written by author Ugo Ojetti, which were translated into German:

See also
 Aircraft of Nuremberg
 Propaganda and censorship in Italy during the First World War
 Rome-Tokyo Raid

References

1910s in Vienna
1918 in Italy
Aerial operations and battles of World War I
August 1918 events
Aviation in World War I
Gabriele D'Annunzio
Italy in World War I
Psychological warfare
World War I propaganda